The following is a list of people executed by the United States military. The list separates executions by branches; the Uniform Code of Military Justice did not exist until 1950.

Executions by the Army (WW2 and Post War) 
The United States Army carried out 141 executions over a three-year period from 1942 to 1945 and a further six executions were conducted during the postwar period, for a known total of 147. These figures do not include individuals executed by the US Army after being convicted by US Military Courts for violations of the laws of war, including German soldiers who were shot after being caught in American uniform as part of Operation Grief during the Battle of the Bulge.

Of these 141 wartime executions, 70 were carried out in the European Theatre, 27 in the Mediterranean Theatre, 21 in the Southwest Pacific Area, 19 in the contiguous United States, two in Hawaii, one in Guadalcanal and one in India; of the six postwar executions, one took place in Hawaii, one in Japan, two in France and two in the Philippines. An execution was also carried out by the United States Air Force in Japan in 1950.

All executions carried out by the Army from 1942 to 1948 were performed under the authority of the Articles of War of June 4, 1920, an Act of Congress which governed military justice between 1920 and 1951.

This list includes members of the United States Army Air Forces, which was a part of the Army until September 18, 1947, when it became independent. Executions by the United States Air Force after 1947 are listed separately.

With the exception of Eddie Slovik, who was shot for desertion, all of these soldiers were executed for murder and/or rape. Several of the soldiers listed as convicted and executed for murder and/or rape had also been convicted of other charges, including those of a military nature such as desertion and mutiny, plus lesser crimes that would not have been considered capital unless combined with more serious offenses which carried the death penalty.

Sources for list in References section.

Plot E 

The US Army executed 98 servicemen following General Courts Martial (GCM) for murder and/or rape in the European Theatre of Operations during the Second World War. The remains of these servicemen were originally buried near the site of their executions, which took place in countries as far apart as England, France, Belgium, Germany, Italy and Algeria. In 1949 the remains of these men and a few others were re-interred in Plot E, a private section specifically built to hold what the Graves Registration referred to as "the dishonorable dead", since (per standard practice) all had been dishonorably discharged from the US Army just prior to their executions.

Plot "E" is detached from the main four cemetery plots for the honored dead of World  at the Oise-Aisne American Cemetery and Memorial. It is located across the road, and deliberately hidden from view, inside a 100' x 50' oval-shaped clearing surrounded by hedges and hidden in thick forest. It is not mentioned on the ABMC website or in any guide pamphlets or maps. The plot is accessible only through the back door of the superintendent's office. Access is difficult and visitors are not encouraged, though the section is maintained by cemetery caretakers who periodically mow the lawn area and trim the hedges. One cemetery employee described Plot E as "a house of shame" and "a perfect anti-memorial". Today Plot E contains nothing but 96 flat stone markers (arranged in four rows) and a single small granite cross. The white grave markers are the size of index cards and have nothing on them except sequential grave numbers engraved in black. Two bodies were later disinterred and allowed to be returned to United States for reburial.

No US flag is permitted to fly over the section, and the numbered graves lie with their backs turned to the main cemetery on the other side of the road.

Three of the people buried in Plot E were not executed: Willie Hall, Joseph J. Mahoney and William N. Lucas, who all died while in military custody.

The only person interred who was not convicted of rape and/or murder was Eddie Slovik, who was executed for desertion on 31 January 1945. In 1987, President Ronald Reagan gave permission for Slovik's remains to be exhumed and returned to the United States for reburial. The remains of Alex F. Miranda were exhumed and returned to the United States in 1990.

Executions of German POWs during World War II
In 1945, the United States Army executed fourteen German prisoners of war by hanging at the United States Disciplinary Barracks, Fort Leavenworth, Kansas. The 14 POWs, members of the German armed services, had been convicted by general court-martial for the murders of fellow Germans believed by their fellow inmates to be collaborating as confidential informants with the United States military authorities. While the murders had been committed in 1943 and 1944, the executions were delayed until after the end of hostilities in Europe due to fears of German retaliation against Allied POWs.

The hangings were carried out in a warehouse elevator shaft which had been converted into a temporary gallows, and the fourteen Germans were buried in the Fort Leavenworth Military Prison Cemetery.

Executions by the United States Air Force
The United States Air Force executed three airmen by hanging between 1950 and 1954. The execution of Robert E. Keller was conducted under the authority of the 1920 Articles of War, and those of Burns and Dennis Jr. were carried out under a short-lived revised version of the Articles of War popularly known as the Elston Act of 1948.

Executions by the United States Navy 

The United States Navy has executed seventeen sailors and Marines for various offenses; the most famous of these were three crew members of the USS Somers who were hanged for conspiracy to mutiny in 1842.

, no member of the U.S. Navy has been executed , when brothers John and Peter Black were simultaneously hanged at the yardarm for leading a mutiny on board the schooner Ewing.

The United States Navy hanged 14 Japanese people for war crimes committed on Guam during the Second World War.

Executions after the enactment of Uniform Code of Military Justice 
A total of ten military executions have been carried out by the United States Army under the provisions of the original Uniform Code of Military Justice of 5 May 1950. Executions must be approved by President of the United States. Executions require a Summary courts martial, they are therefore subject an automatic process of review. The first four of these executions,  those of Bernard J. O'Brien,  Chastine Beverly,  Louis M. Suttles and James L. Riggins, were carried out by military officials at the Kansas State Penitentiary near Lansing, Kansas. The remaining six executions took place in the boiler room of the United States Disciplinary Barracks, Fort Leavenworth, Kansas.  Hanging and not shooting was the method employed in these ten executions.

People currently awaiting execution under the UCMJ 
Four people are currently awaiting execution under the UCMJ. All executions, if carried out, will be by lethal injection.

See also
 Capital punishment by the United States military
 Capital punishment in the United States
 Military prison

References

Sources
Information on listed military executions between 1942 and 1961 has been primarily derived from the following sources.  Research on these executions continues.

 A handwritten list,  Executed Death Cases Before 1951,  discovered at The Pentagon in December 2003. The list is only partially legible and must therefore be used with some caution.  The linked public version of this list is quite truncated,  thereby omitting a great deal of useful information about these cases.  The supplemental addendum,  Death Sentence Ledger,   tracks military capital cases between 1950 and 1967.
 Two tables of U.S. Soldiers executed during World War II's European Theater and Pacific Theater may be found on Before the Needle 
 The U.S. Rosters of World War II Dead, 1939–1945 (payment required) contains the names of many American servicemen executed by military authority overseas. These people are generally identified in the Rosters as GP (or General Prisoners) and were interred under the category of Administrative Decision.
 The Nationwide Gravesite Locator contains the names of numerous executed soldiers,  many of them listed as being General Prisoners.
 The U.S. Veterans Gravesites, ca. 1775–2006 (payment required) contains the names of numerous executed soldiers,  many of them listed as being General Prisoners.
 Historical archives of the Stars and Stripes Newspaper, WWII Europe and North Africa Editions, 1942–1958 (payment required) contain numerous contemporary references to military executions.
 Death Penalty Cases in WWII Military Courts: Lessons Learned from North Africa and Italy,  a paper written by Professor J. Robert Lilly of the School of Law,   Northern Kentucky University,  and Associate Professor J. Michael Thomson of the Political Science Department Northern Kentucky University,  and presented at the 41st Annual Meeting of the Academy of Criminal Justice Sciences March 10–13, 2004. Las Vegas, NV,  contains statistical information on 97 executions carried out in the European Theatre and the Mediterranean Theatre of World War II.  It does not appear to be available online at this time.
 Taken by Force,  by J.  Robert Lilly, published by Palgrave Macmillan in August 2007,  discusses crimes of sexual violence committed by American soldiers in the Second World War.  It contains numerous references to military capital cases during this period.
  Official File,  Court Martial Cases,  Franklin D.  Roosevelt Library,  contains information on sentence confirmation dates of soldiers executed for capital crimes within the continental United States between 1942 and 1945.
 Official File, Court Martial Cases, Harry Truman Museum and Library,  contains information on sentence confirmation dates of soldiers and members of the Air Force executed between 1945 and 1954.
 History of the JAG Branch Office, U.S. Forces, European Theater,  18 July 1942 to 1 Nov. 1945: n.a., Vol. 1–2, prep. by the Branch Office of the JAG-ETO, n.p ., n.d. (1946?),  contains a summary on 70 military executions carried out in the European theater between 1943 and 1945.
 Ted Darcy Casualty Database
 Subchapter X, "Punitive Articles" of the Uniform Code of Military Justice

United States military
United States military law
Executed
Unit
Unit
Unit